The 2013–14 FC Rostov season was the fifth successive season that the club will play in the Russian Premier League, the highest tier of football in Russia, after narrowly avoiding relegation in 2012–13 after a relegation play-off victory over . They will also take part in the 2013–14 Russian Cup.

Squad
As of 19 February 2014. According to the Official Russian Premier League website 

 (captain)

Out on loan

The following players are listed on the official club's website as reserves and are registered with the Premier League. They are eligible to play for the main squad.

Reserve squad

Transfers

Summer

In:

 

Out:

Winter

In:

 
 

Out:

Competitions

Friendlies

Russian Premier League

Results by round

Matches

League table

Russian Cup

{{Footballbox collapsible
|round = Round of 16
|date = 2 March 2014 	
|time = - MSK (UTC+4)
|team1 = Rostov
|score = 3–0 'awarded
|report = Summary
|team2= Alania Vladikavkaz
|goals1=
|goals2= 
|location = Rostov-on-Don
|stadium = Olimp – 2
|attendance= 
|referee=
|result = W
|stack = yes
}}

Squad statistics

Appearances and goals

|-
|colspan="14"|Players away from the club on loan:|-
|colspan="14"|Players who appeared for Rostov no longer at the club:''

|}

Top scorers

Disciplinary record

References

FC Rostov seasons
Rostov